Astraea, Astrea or Astria ("star-maiden" or "starry night"), in ancient Greek religion, is a daughter of Astraeus and Eos. She is the virgin goddess of justice, innocence, purity and precision. She is closely associated with the Greek goddess of justice, Dike (daughter of Zeus and Themis). She is not to be confused with Asteria, the goddess of the stars and the daughter of Coeus and Phoebe. The main belt asteroid 5 Astraea is named after her, and her name was also suggested for the planet Uranus.

Mythology 
Astraea, the celestial virgin, was the last of the immortals to live with humans during the Golden Age, one of the old Greek religion's five deteriorating Ages of Man. In the Iron Age, the world was illegally rampant. People only coveted gold, while family and friends did not trust each other. According to Ovid, Astraea abandoned the earth during the Iron Age.  Fleeing from the new wickedness of humanity, she ascended to heaven to become the constellation Virgo. The nearby constellation Libra reflected her symbolic association with Dike, who, in Latin culture as Justitia, is said to preside over the constellation. In the tarot, the 8th card (or 11th, depending on the Tarot system followed), Justice, with a figure of Justitia, can thus be considered related to the figure of Astraea on historical iconographic grounds.

According to myth, Astraea will one day come back to Earth, bringing with her the return of the utopian Golden Age of which she was the ambassador.

In literature
Astraea's hoped-for return was referred to in a phrase from Virgil's Eclogue 4: "" (Astraea returns, returns old Saturn's reign).

During the European Renaissance, Astraea became associated with the general spirit of renewal of culture occurring at that time, particularly in England, where she became poetically identified in literature with the figure of Queen Elizabeth I as the virgin Queen reigning over a new Golden Age. In Spain, she was often identified with the rule of Philip IV. The French author Honoré d'Urfé wrote a very popular serial novel called L'Astrée, whose titular heroine is named after Astraea, which was published serially between 1607 and 1627 with each installment very much anticipated by the aristocratic public at the time; Jean-Jacques Rousseau in his Confessions (p. 160 Penguin Classics) notes it as one of the novels read with his father and says it "was the one that recurred most frequently to my mind". A spectacle play by the Count of Villamediana and thirteen dramas by Pedro Calderón de la Barca introduce a character named Astraea to highlight the political and astrological concerns. In Russia, Astraea was identified first with Elizabeth, then with Catherine the Great.

The English epic poet Edmund Spenser further embellished this myth at the opening of Book V of The Faerie Queene (1596), where he claims that Astraea left behind "" called Talus. William Shakespeare refers to Astraea in Titus Andronicus, and also in Henry VI, Part 1.  In his most famous play, Life Is a Dream, Calderón has a character named Rosaura (an anagram for "dawns") take on the name of Astraea at Court. This may be a laudatory political allusion to the dawn of a new Golden Age under Philip IV/Segismundo.

John Dryden's poem Astraea Redux is titled to compare the return of Charles II to England at the end of Interregnum to the return of Astraea.

Astraea is also referenced in John Milton's epic poem Paradise Lost, in Book IV between lines 990 and 1000. When Satan is discovered in the Garden of Eden and brought before the Angel Gabriel, the two are on the verge of war.

The British writer Aphra Behn used "Astrea" as one of her code-names while working as a spy for King Charles II. She subsequently used the name "Astrea" to identify the speaker in many of her poems, and was herself referred to as "The Incomparable Astrea".

The goddess's return forms the framing device of Delarivier Manley's 1709 satire The New Atalantis. Astrea is the one of the three allegorical female narrators.

James Thornhill depicted Astraea in the painted Hall of the Old Royal Naval College, Greenwich, in a mural portraying the accession of the House of Hanover as the return of the Golden Age.

"Astræa" is also the title of a poem by Ralph Waldo Emerson.

In Book 2 of Robert Browning's The Ring and the Book, there is the following reference:

 There’s an end to all hope of justice more. Astraea's gone indeed, let hope go too! Who is it dares impugn the natural law? Deny God’s word "the faithless wife shall die?"

See also
 Adikia
 Astrotheology
 Dike
 Lady Justice
 Themis

Notes

References 

 Aratus Solensis, Phaenomena translated by G. R. Mair. Loeb Classical Library Volume 129. London: William Heinemann, 1921. Online version at the Topos Text Project.
 Aratus Solensis, Phaenomena. G. R. Mair. London: William Heinemann; New York: G.P. Putnam's Sons. 1921. Greek text available at the Perseus Digital Library.
 Gaius Julius Hyginus, Astronomica from The Myths of Hyginus translated and edited by Mary Grant. University of Kansas Publications in Humanistic Studies. Online version at the Topos Text Project.
 Publius Ovidius Naso, Metamorphoses translated by Brookes More (1859-1942). Boston, Cornhill Publishing Co. 1922. Online version at the Perseus Digital Library.
 Publius Ovidius Naso, Metamorphoses. Hugo Magnus. Gotha (Germany). Friedr. Andr. Perthes. 1892. Latin text available at the Perseus Digital Library.

Justice goddesses
Children of Zeus
Greek virgin goddesses
Stellar goddesses
Children of Eos
Virgo in astrology